The Australia national cricket team toured South Africa from 13 October to 21 November 2011. The tour consisted of two Twenty20 Internationals (T20I), three One Day Internationals (ODIs) and two Tests.

Squads

 * = withdrawn

Tour matches

South Africa A v Australians

T20I series

1st T20I

2nd T20I

ODI series

1st ODI

2nd ODI

3rd ODI

Test series

1st Test

South Africa won the toss and elected to field. At the end of the first day, Australia had made 214 for the loss of 8 wickets, with South African bowler Dale Steyn picking up 4 wickets for 31 runs. On the second day, Australia were eventually dismissed for 284, with Michael Clarke equalling his third highest Test score with 151. Batting second, South Africa were dismissed for just 96 runs, with Australian all-rounder Shane Watson taking five wickets for 17 runs in five overs. In their second innings, Australia were reduced to 13–3 by tea on the second day. After tea they went from 21–6 to 21–9, before being bowled out for 47 runs. This was their fourth lowest Test score and their lowest total for 109 years. Debutant Vernon Philander finished with figures of 5–15 from seven overs. On the third day, Graeme Smith and Hashim Amla both reached centuries to help South Africa to an 8-wicket victory.

2nd Test

Notes

References

2011–12
2011–12 South African cricket season
2011 in South African cricket
International cricket competitions in 2011–12
2011 in Australian cricket